Buffalo Bills Stadium is an American football stadium that has been proposed for use by the Buffalo Bills to be constructed in Orchard Park, New York and succeed Highmark Stadium with the opening planned to begin in 2026.

The 62,000 seat stadium would cost $1.35 billion and be built adjacent to Erie Community College’s south campus across the street from Highmark Stadium, which would be demolished following the completion of the new stadium. The stadium will be designed by Populous, who previously designed Sahlen Field in downtown Buffalo and twelve other active NFL stadiums, with which the new Orchard Park stadium will share numerous design elements and features.

Background
The Buffalo Bills' lease included a provision allowing for the creation of a working group to explore options for either a new stadium for the team, or an extensive retrofit of their current Highmark Stadium.

On February 10, 2014, Governor Andrew Cuomo's administration appointed Buffalo Mayor Byron Brown, Niagara Falls Mayor Paul Dyster, Lt. Gov. Robert Duffy, Buffalo Niagara Partnership CEO Dottie Gallagher-Cohen and Empire State Development President Kenneth Adams to a new study board to discuss the feasibility and plans for a new stadium.

Later, on March 6, 2014, the County of Erie appointed its seven members to the board, including future New York State governor Kathy Hochul, then with M&T Bank, and Richard Tobe, the Deputy Erie County Executive.

Shortly after the death of owner Ralph Wilson, on March 27, 2014, the Bills selected their members for the panel, including U.S. Senator Charles Schumer, Bills CEO and President Russ Brandon, local developer Louis Ciminelli, Bills CFO Jeff Littman, New Era Cap Co. CEO Christopher Koch among others. The group's first meeting was held on April 1.

On November 5, 2014, Terry and Kim Pegula joined the working group.

In mid-January 2015, AECOM, retained by the State of New York, released a report detailing suggested stadium sites based upon criteria of site size, cost of land, infrastructure and external development, among other factors. The study narrowed the search to four sites.

The Pegulas indicated on July 31, 2015 that they had no immediate plans to pursue a new stadium. The situation remained unchanged as of November 2017. By March 2018, the Pegulas had entered the "very early stages" of exploring long-term stadium options for the Bills. In September 2018, the Pegulas stated that they would begin planning the new stadium, or possibly renovating the current one, after the November 2018 gubernatorial elections, as state funding would likely be required.

During the fall of 2018, PS&E hired consultant CAA ICON to handle stadium planning for both the Bills and the Buffalo Sabres, with no constraints on potential locations. Concurrently, Erie County has created a new stadium fund, for which $500,000 was set aside in 2018 with the same amount earmarked for 2019. The first focus groups were assembled in February 2019.

Mark Poloncarz, the current county executive of Erie County, New York, stated in 2012 that a stadium in the city of Buffalo would not be feasible, as too much property in the city remained in private hands, which would trigger an eminent domain lawsuit if it were seized to build the stadium. He reiterated those concerns in 2019, though in that case he stopped short of ruling out a stadium within the city so as not to disrupt negotiations.

During the January 2020 State of the League address, commissioner Roger Goodell stated in regard to the Bills' stadium plans: “Those are things that the group has to settle collectively and to address over the next several months, if not sooner.”

On June 18, 2021, the Pegulas chose Legends Global Planning to represent ownership, consult on a new stadium and sell sponsorships and premium seats for the venue. In addition, an unnamed source claimed that the Bills were planning to build a new stadium in Orchard Park to replace Highmark Stadium, with two of the television stations in Rochester, New York reporting the unnamed source's claims as fact. A June 19 report from WGRZ in Buffalo, also neither confirmed nor denied by any officials, stated that the Bills strongly preferred to build a new stadium and not attempt any further renovations on Highmark Stadium.

In early August it was reported that Pegula Sports and Entertainment had made their first offer demanding full taxpayer funding of a new stadium in Orchard Park at a cost of $1.1 billion, part of a broader $1.5 billion package that would also include renovations to KeyBank Center, Buffalo's indoor sports arena. The Pegulas reportedly threatened to relocate the team to Austin, Texas if their demands were not met, though they had not contacted anybody in Austin prior to suggesting the idea.

On August 31, 2021, the Bills submitted their plans for a $1.4 billion, 60,000-seat stadium in Orchard Park to representatives of the state and Erie County to be completed by 2027. The proposed capacity is 12,000 seats less than Highmark Stadium and 1,500 seats less than Soldier Field, the lowest capacity stadium currently used in the NFL (and whose main tenant the Chicago Bears are also exploring a new stadium). Unusually for an American sports venue, the stadium would not be an all-seater: a 5,000-person standing room only deck would also be included in the venue, potentially increasing capacity to 68,000. The new venue will not include a roof, but it would be designed so that a majority of the seats would be protected from the elements, and thus the stadium would be ineligible to host the Super Bowl; civic leaders in Buffalo argued that Buffalo lacked the infrastructure to host the Super Bowl, nor any other event large enough to make full use of the venue outside of football, and that the team should not bother trying to build a stadium for such events, nor bid for them. The city's reputation for cold, snowy weather also played into the team's decision to make the new stadium open-air, as the snowy conditions often make for compelling television.

On March 28, 2022, it was announced that a deal had been reached between New York State, Erie County and the Bills for the 63,000 seat, $1.4 billion dollar stadium in Orchard Park. New York State will contribute $600 million in funding with Erie County contributing $250 million, the Bills contributing $350 million, and the National Football League via a G-4 loan $200 million. In addition the Bills signed a 30-year lease, with a buyout option after 15 years. The stadium would be owned by New York State, a change from the current stadium which is owned by Erie County. Of that $600 million funding, $418 million will come from funds seized from the Seneca Nation of New York for funds overdue as part of the compact to operate the Seneca Niagara Casino, Seneca Allegany Casino and Seneca Buffalo Creek Casino. The state will also contribute $100 million over a 15-year period for maintenance and $6 million per year over the course of the lease for capital improvements, both figures to be adjusted for inflation according to the Consumer Price Index.

Neil deMause, co-author of the book Field of Schemes (2008), has criticized the financing plan for not taking present value of money fully into account.  For example, much of the construction money will be paid upfront, whereas the hoped-for increases in economic activity and tax revenues will take place over the next 30 years.

Former proposals

Outer Harbor stadium proposal
The first major Buffalo Bills stadium proposal was presented in 2012. On October 23, George Hasiotis and Nicholas Stracick of Greater Buffalo Sports and Entertainment Complex, a Delaware-based LLC, presented a rendered plan created by architect firm HKS, Inc. to the Buffalo Common Council. The plan included a $1.4 billion, 72,000-seat retractable roof stadium, convention center, hotel and sports museum plan for the Buffalo Outer Harbor. At first this plan was met with some cynicism, in particular because of the feasibility of the project.

On December 11, the company met with local AFL-CIO members to discuss the number of jobs created by the proposed project, which was said to be 10,000. Stracick also disclosed that there are "15 private, secret sponsors" willing to fund the project. He also stated that no tax money would be used to fund a stadium.

In January 2013, the group met with Erie County legislators, their second major appearance since October. During this meeting, the idea of having the Strong Foundation open a sports museum on the $1.8 billion premises was also strengthened.

Howard Zemsky, chairman of the NFTA said that he was opposed to the project, referring to the idea of granting a nine to twelve month option on the waterfront land, saying simply "we're not doing that."

On August 26, 2014, it was announced that the Outer Harbor site was no longer being considered, after a study showed that at least four bridges would need to be built to effectively service the increase in traffic.

Buffalo Sports Corridor
On May 11, 2014, another proposal for an outer harbor sports complex was announced by Buffalo Sportz Complex, known as "Olympia Sports Park." This complex would have been located slightly south of the GBSEC proposed site.

Thomas Dee, President of the Erie County Harbor Development Corporation, acknowledged the proposal but also noted that similar projects, including the GBSEC proposal, also existed for competition.

Artvoice proposal
The August 7, 2014, issue of Artvoice, a local magazine for the Buffalo area, detailed a plan for a new Bills stadium and retail in downtown Buffalo, immediately to the east of the KeyBank Center.

AECOM report
The AECOM report recommended four sites, including along the Buffalo River and Ohio Street, next to the KeyBank Center, at the current site of Highmark Stadium, and across from Sahlen Field.

Other potential stadium locations mentioned or rumored, included:

Land bordered by Illinois, Exchange, Michigan and Perry Streets in downtown Buffalo, near the KeyBank Center
A portion of the Lackawanna/Bethlehem Steel site in Lackawanna
Land north of Interstate 90 outside of Batavia
Pyramid Companies developer Scott Congel once suggested a plot of land in West Seneca, on the site of the former Seneca Mall

On August 26, 2014, it was announced that the Niagara Falls (which may have used a large plot being held by Howard Milstein) and Buffalo Outer Harbor sites had been ruled out based on similar issues with infrastructure related to the two sites.

References

Buffalo Bills stadiums
Proposed stadiums in the United States
Proposed buildings and structures in New York (state)